Maulsby is an unincorporated community in Stoddard County, in the U.S. state of Missouri.

Maulsby was founded c. 1902, and named after the local Maulsby family.

References

Unincorporated communities in Stoddard County, Missouri
Unincorporated communities in Missouri
1902 establishments in Missouri